Orc Attack is a fixed shooter video game written by Dean Lock for the Atari 8-bit family and published in 1983 by Thorn EMI. The game was re-released, along with Commodore 64 and ZX Spectrum ports, when Thorn rebranded as Creative Sparks, and later at budget price by Sparklers and Top Ten. In Orc Attack, the player protects a castle wall by dropping boulders on ladder climbing orcs. Though the visuals are low resolution, Orc Attack has a high level of violence.

Gameplay

The player moves back and forth along the top of a castle wall, defending it from an orc horde by dropping rocks and pouring boiling oil. Attackers use ladders to scale the wall. Should one of them climb all the way to the ramparts, the player can kill it with a sword, but this diverts attention from the climbing orcs. An evil sorcerer also sends evil spirits against players.

Reception
Atari 8-bit magazine ANALOG Computing called Orc Attack "easily the most violent and gratuitously satisfying shoot-'em-up on the market today (although "drop-'em-down" might be a more accurate label)." Arcade Express concluded, "Orc Attack combines fast-paced action with lots of strategy to produce a strong overall program"—8/10.

ZX Spectrum magazine CRASH gave Orc Attack a 91% rating.

References

External links
Orc Attack at Atari Mania

Orc Attack at Spectrum Computing

1983 video games
Atari 8-bit family games
Commodore 64 games
Fantasy video games
Fixed shooters
Orcs in popular culture
Video games developed in the United Kingdom
Video games set in castles
ZX Spectrum games
Multiplayer and single-player video games